BruDirect is a daily online Brunei newspaper, established in 1999.  The newspaper was founded by the Brunei journalist Ignatius Stephen and is published in both the Malay and English languages.

References

Newspapers published in Brunei
English-language newspapers published in Asia
Malay-language newspapers